ArenaBowl XXVI was the 26th edition of the championship in the Arena Football League. The National Conference champion  Arizona Rattlers, defeated the American Conference champion Philadelphia Soul, 48–39. The game was played on August 17, 2013 at Amway Center in Orlando, Florida, home of the Orlando Predators.

The two teams met one year earlier in ArenaBowl XXV, in which the Rattlers took home the league championship by a score of 72–54. This was the first time that two teams met in consecutive ArenaBowls.

ArenaBowl XXVI's week was produced by Ryan Johnston of InterPhase Entertainment, LLC who was brought on to produce the Gala, the KISS concert at the Amway Center in Orlando the night before the game, and production of ArenaBowl XXVI itself that was seen LIVE on CBS.  InterPhase Entertainment, LLC produced the 800 person AFL Awards Gala where KISS gave a 30 minute acoustic performance in their suits, after their new team the LA KISS was announced at a press conference also overseen by InterPhase.  KISS' acoustic performance was followed by LEOGUN and Mary Miranda.

Venue
ArenaBowl XXVI was played at Amway Center in Orlando, Florida, after a unanimous vote by all 14 teams in the league. It was the second consecutive ArenaBowl to be played at a neutral site, and the seventh in the history of the league. For the city of Orlando, it was the first ArenaBowl played there since ArenaBowl XIV in 2000 when the Orlando Predators defeated the Nashville Katz at the since-demolished Amway Arena.

Television
ArenaBowl XXVI was televised by CBS, as part of a two-year agreement between the league and the network to air weekly regular season games, as well as two postseason games, on CBS Sports Network.

Background

Philadelphia Soul

The Soul reached the ArenaBowl for the second consecutive season, having lost to the Rattlers in ArenaBowl XXV. They began the  season with a 4–4 record, but proceeded to win eight of their ten remaining regular season games to clinch their division again with a 12–6 record. In the conference semifinals, they defeated the Orlando Predators in a back-and-forth affair by a 59–55 score. In the conference championship, they faced the Jacksonville Sharks as they had in the previous season. Philadelphia won the game on the road 75–59 to earn their third ArenaBowl berth in franchise history.

Arizona Rattlers

The Rattlers came into the game as defending champions, having defeated Philadelphia in ArenaBowl XXV. In , the Rattlers finished the regular season with a 15–3 record, one win short of matching a franchise record. With home field advantage in the playoffs, they defeated the San Jose SaberCats in the conference semifinals 59–49, and then the Spokane Shock in the conference championship 65–57. Arizona made their eighth ArenaBowl appearance, and it was also the third consecutive season that the Rattlers made it to the league championship.

Box score

References

026
2013 Arena Football League season
2013 in sports in Florida
2010s in Orlando, Florida
American football in Orlando, Florida
Arena Football League in Florida
Philadelphia Soul
Arizona Rattlers
Sports competitions in Orlando, Florida
2013 in American television
August 2013 sports events in the United States